The Meisch House, also known as the Garlack House, was built in 1888 in Dakota County, Nebraska and was listed on the National Register of Historic Places in 1986.

It was built as a square-plan  by  house by local brickmaker Peter Meisch.  A kitchen wing was added later.

See also
American Foursquare, a more complex square-plan architecture

References

External links 
More photos of the Meisch House at Wikimedia Commons

Houses on the National Register of Historic Places in Nebraska
Houses completed in 1888
Houses in Dakota County, Nebraska